The Ridgewood Country Club (RCC) is a country club located in Paramus, New Jersey, a suburb northwest of New York City in Bergen County. It was founded in 1890 in neighboring Ho-Ho-Kus, but has been at its current location since 1926.  Its facilities were listed on the National Register of Historic Places in 2015.

History
The 27-hole golf course was designed by A. W. Tillinghast in 1929, and the clubhouse was designed by Clifford Wendehack. The greens are seeded with poa annua and bentgrass, and its fairways and tees are seeded with poa annua, bentgrass, and ryegrass. It was certified as an Audubon Cooperative Sanctuary in 1996. Since 2000, RCC has worked with architect Gil Hanse to restore the course back to its Tillinghast roots. Among the improvements have been the construction of 48 new or rebuilt tees, a new irrigation system, a new Greens and Grounds complex, an expansion of the pond on hole #1 on the Center nine, extensive drainage and the rebuilding of all the bunkers back to their original Tillinghast design. The three challenging and scenic nines are known as Center, West, and East, referring to their location relative to the clubhouse.

Golf legend Byron Nelson worked as an assistant professional at the club in the mid-1930s, early in his career and represented Ridgewood for several of his early significant victories. Nelson went on to become one of golf's all-time greatest players.

Rankings
Ranked #56 Classical in U.S by Golfweek magazine - July 2018
Ranked #79 in U.S. by Golf Magazine - 2017
Hole #6 Center ranked among Top 500 Holes in the World by Golf Magazine - 2000
Ranked #84 Most Prestigious Clubs in America by Golf Connoisseur magazine - Winter 2006
Holes #4 West and #6 Center Ranked among Sports Illustrated "Tillinghast Dream 18" - June 2006

Notable events
2022 U.S. Amateur Championship - Sam Bennett
2018 The Northern Trust, first tournament of the FedEx Cup - Bryson DeChambeau
2016 U.S. Girls' Junior Championship - Seong Eun-jeong
2014 The Barclays, PGA Tour FedEx Cup - Hunter Mahan
2010 The Barclays, PGA Tour FedEx Cup - Matt Kuchar
2008 The Barclays, PGA Tour FedEx Cup - Vijay Singh
2001 Senior PGA Championship - Tom Watson
1990 U.S. Senior Open - Lee Trevino
1981 Coca-Cola Classic - Kathy Whitworth
1974 U.S. Amateur Championship - Jerry Pate
1957 U.S. Senior Amateur - J. Clark Espie
1935 Ryder Cup - United States

References

External links

Satellite images of the golf course

Golf clubs and courses in New Jersey
Golf clubs and courses designed by A. W. Tillinghast
Golf clubs and courses on the National Register of Historic Places
Ryder Cup venues
Paramus, New Jersey
Sports venues completed in 1929
1890 establishments in New Jersey
National Register of Historic Places in Bergen County, New Jersey
Sports venues on the National Register of Historic Places in New Jersey